Christopher Lutz (born 24 February 1971) is a German chess grandmaster and a two-time German Chess Champion.

Chess career
Born in 1971, Lutz earned his international master title in 1989 and his grandmaster title in 1992. He won the German Chess Championship in 1995 and 2001. In 2000 he competed on board 4 for the German team that won the silver medal at the 34th Chess Olympiad in Istanbul.

As of early 2006, Lutz was working as a consultant for the Hydra chess project. He concentrated on developing the opening book for Hydra, as well as creating test positions, until the discontinuation of the project in 2009.

Lutz is the No. 28 ranked German player as of May 2018, with a FIDE rating of 2537.

Private life 
Since the summer of 2006 he is married to the German chess master Anke Lutz. The couple has two daughters.

Bibliography

Endgame Secrets: How to Plan in the Endgame in Chess, by Christopher Lutz, 1999, Batsford.  .

References

External links

Hydra Chess

German chess players
Chess grandmasters
Chess Olympiad competitors
1971 births
Living people
German chess writers
German male non-fiction writers